Rafael Aguilar Morillo (born 27 December 1961) is a Spanish water polo player. He competed in the 1984 Summer Olympics.

References

External links
 

1961 births
Living people
Sportspeople from Terrassa
Spanish male water polo players
Olympic water polo players of Spain
Water polo players at the 1984 Summer Olympics
Spanish water polo coaches
Spain men's national water polo team coaches
Water polo coaches at the 2008 Summer Olympics
Water polo coaches at the 2012 Summer Olympics
Water polo players from Catalonia
21st-century Spanish people